Walter W. Winans (April 5, 1852 – August 12, 1920) was an American marksman, horse breeder, sculptor, and painter who participated in the 1908 and 1912 Summer Olympics. He won two medals for shooting: a gold in 1908 and a silver in 1912, as well as demonstrating the sport of pistol duelling in the 1908 Games.  He also won a gold medal for his sculpture An American Trotter at Stockholm in 1912. In addition, Winans wrote ten books.

Biography
He was born to Americans William Louis Winans and Maria Ann de la Rue on April 5, 1852, at the Nikolaevsky Railway Works at St. Petersburg, Russian Empire. His father was engaged in construction work and Walter lived in St. Petersburg until the age of 18, taking the oath of allegiance at the US Embassy before leaving for Kent, England, to take up residence.

In 1910 he sent several horses to the National Horse Show in Madison Square Garden in New York City.

In the 1901 edition of his book The Art of Revolver Shooting he favoured the Webley–Fosbery above other 'automatic pistols',  but it is not mentioned in the 1911 edition nor in the subsequent Automatic Pistol Shooting or The Modern Pistol and How to Shoot it.

In 1884  he prosecuted a Scotsman, Muirdoch Macrae, for grazing a lamb on land owned by Winans. The failure of Winans' prosecution established the right to roam which was a key element in opening British parklands to the public.

Winans range at the National Shooting Centre, Bisley, England is named after him.

Winans died in Parsloes Park, Dagenham, Essex, on 12 August 1920.

Bibliography
The Art of Revolver Shooting, New York:  Knickerbocker Press, 1901 [Riling 1527]
Hints on Revolver Shooting, New York:  Putnam's, 1904 [Riling 1597]
Practical Rifle Shooting, New York:  Putnam's, 1906 [Riling 1630]
The Sporting Rifle, New York:  Putnam's, 1908 [Riling 1662]
The Art of Revolver Shooting, Rev. Ed., New York:  Knickerbocker Press, 1911 [Riling 1527 var.]
Shooting for Ladies, New York:  Putnam's, 1911 [Riling 1730]
"Revolvers" – an article in Encyclopedia of Sports & Games in Four Volumes, Vol IV, published by The Sportsman (1912)
Deer Breeding for Fine Heads (1913)
Animal Sculpture (1914)
Pistolen- und Revolverschiessen (1914) translation of The Art of Revolver Shooting, with amendments, by Dr. Maxim Goldberg
Automatic Pistol Shooting, New York:  Putnam's, 1915 [Riling 1806]
The Modern Pistol & How to Shoot it, New York:  Putnam's, 1919 [Riling 1884]
How to Handle a Revolver London: Geo Newnes (pages 289 to 295 of CB Fry's Magazine Vol II 1904 to 1905)
"Some Hints on Revolver Shooting in Competitions", an article in a book published in a "Book of Sports" (title to be confirmed) by Cassell's and Company of London in 1903 or 1904.
How to Drive a Trotter, London: Geo Newnes (pp. 498–500 of CB Fry's Magazine Vol II 1904 to 1905)
References are to Ray Riling, Guns and Shooting, a Bibliography, New York:  Greenberg, 1951

See also
List of Olympic medalists in shooting
Art competitions at the Summer Olympics

References

External links
 
 
 

1852 births
1920 deaths
19th-century American painters
19th-century American male artists
American male painters
20th-century American painters
American male sport shooters
Running target shooters
Shooters at the 1908 Summer Olympics
Shooters at the 1912 Summer Olympics
Olympic gold medalists for the United States in shooting
Olympic silver medalists for the United States in shooting
Olympic gold medalists in art competitions
Medalists at the 1908 Summer Olympics
Medalists at the 1912 Summer Olympics
20th-century American sculptors
20th-century American male artists
19th-century American sculptors
American male sculptors
Olympic competitors in art competitions
American expatriates in the United Kingdom